Naseem Hamed (born 12 February 1974), nicknamed Prince Naseem and Naz, is a British former professional boxer who competed from 1992 to 2002. He held multiple featherweight world championships, including the WBO title from 1995 to 2000; the IBF title in 1997; and the WBC title from 1999 to 2000. He also reigned as lineal champion from 1998 to 2001; IBO champion from 2002 to 2003; and held the European bantamweight title from 1994 to 1995. Hamed is ranked the best British featherweight of all time by BoxRec. In 2015, he was inducted into the International Boxing Hall of Fame.

Hamed was known for his unconventional boxing antics and spectacular ring entrances which included entering the ring on a flying carpet, a lift, and a palanquin, as well as re-enacting the video of Michael Jackson's Thriller, and wearing a Halloween mask. He was also known for his front somersault over the top rope into the ring, his highly athletic and hard-hitting southpaw boxing style, and formidable one-punch knockout power, having finished his career with a knockout-to-win ratio of 84%. With his cocky persona and high-profile bouts he was a prominent figure in 1990s British pop culture, while Sean Ingle in The Guardian writes, “in his prime, Hamed was a global superstar“. A headliner on both sides of the Atlantic, Dan Rafael of ESPN writes, “one of the biggest stars in the sport, the guy sold out arenas before his opponent was even named.”

As of May 2022, BoxRec ranks Hamed as the 35th greatest European pound-for-pound boxer of all time and the 17th greatest British fighter of all time. In 2016, ESPN ranked Hamed at number 22 on its list of the top 25 fighters, pound for pound, of the last 25 years. World Boxing, a sister publication of The Ring magazine, ranked Hamed the 11th greatest British boxer of all-time, and Gareth A. Davies of The Telegraph ranked him 10th. The Ring also ranked Hamed the 46th greatest puncher of all-time.

Early life
Hamed was born in Sheffield, Yorkshire, England to Yemeni parents, in 1974. A protege of Brendan Ingle's Wincobank gym, his talent and flashy southpaw style marked him out from an early age.

Professional career

Early years
Hamed started boxing professionally at flyweight in 1992. He soon began rising through the ranks as he knocked out a series of opponents in the opening rounds. At age 20, he won the European bantamweight title, comprehensively beating the beleaguered Vincenzo Belcastro over twelve rounds. After one defence he won the WBC International super bantamweight title in 1994, overwhelming Freddy Cruz in Sheffield, whom he severely punished and stopped in six rounds. Hamed's popularity grew, his unorthodox style winning a large fan base and his boxing antics generating a large group of detractors. After signing for Frank Warren, Hamed, employing more spectacular entrances, knocked out better opposition in Enrique Angeles and Juan Polo Pérez, both within two rounds.

World featherweight champion

Hamed vs. Robinson
Later in 1995, after controversially being named the WBO #1 featherweight contender (despite never having boxed at that weight), Hamed moved up to face Wales' defending WBO champion Steve Robinson. After dominating the bout and scoring a knockdown in round 5, Hamed won the title when the referee stopped the fight in round 8 after Robinson was caught with a left hook that dropped him spectacularly. The fight was held in front of Robinson's home crowd at the rugby ground, Cardiff Arms Park, with rain pouring down on the fighters and the ring. This was also the first bout where Hamed badly injured his hand, a problem that would continue for the rest of his career.

Hamed vs. Medina
Hamed's next defence was in Dublin against former two-time world featherweight title holder Manuel Medina. After knocking Medina down heavily in round 2, Hamed struggled to finish the fight until finally knocking Medina down twice in the 10th round. Finally, at the end of round 11, Medina's corner withdrew him from the fight on the advice of the ringside doctor. Hamed revealed in his post-fight interview that he had fought with a heavy cold. Medina would go on to have many more tough title fights, remarkably winning versions of the featherweight world title another three times. Hamed's next opponent was the 27–0 Remigio Molina of Argentina, who was stopped in two rounds.

Hamed vs. Johnson

In February 1997, Hamed defeated long-time IBF champion Tom "Boom Boom" Johnson in eight rounds in a unification bout at the London Arena. After being constantly stunned and staggered from round 3 onwards, Johnson was finally dropped by a huge uppercut, then saved from further punishment by the referee. Hamed's first defence of both the WBO & IBF titles was a first-round KO of veteran British boxer and European champion Billy Hardy. Before the bout Hamed had correctly predicted he would win in round 1. The next defence was an easy two-round win against a hugely outclassed Juan Gerardo Cabrera. Due to boxing politics involving the IBF's mandatory challenger, Hamed was soon forced to relinquish the IBF title.

Hamed vs. Badillo
In Hamed's hometown of Sheffield in October 1997, he produced one of the best performances of his career in defending his WBO title against Jose Badillo, whose corner entered the ring to stop the fight during round 7. Hamed's status as one of the biggest draws in the sport was evident with a stellar undercard that included Joe Calzaghe vs. Chris Eubank for the world super middleweight title.

Hamed vs. Kelley

In late 1997 Hamed made his heavily hyped U.S. debut. His ceremonious arrival on the British Airways Concorde was covered by multiple media outlets. There, he and former WBC title holder Kevin Kelley fought in a highly entertaining bout at New York's Madison Square Garden. Prior to the fight, Kelley told Hamed, “I’m gonna smoke your boots”. This fight marks something of a watershed in Hamed's career, as he was forced, for the first time, to abandon his hands-down style of fighting throughout the entire course of the bout, given the calibre of Kelley. Nonetheless, despite suffering three knockdowns himself, Hamed put Kelley down for a third and final time to win by a fourth-round knockout. This was his first of many fights on HBO.

Other title defences

In 1998, Hamed enjoyed victories over former three-time WBA title holder and then-lineal champion Wilfredo Vazquez (TKO 7), former WBC bantamweight title holder Wayne McCullough (W 12), and future IBF title holder Paul Ingle (TKO 11; no relation to Hamed's then-former trainer Brendan Ingle).

Hamed vs. Soto

In October 1999 at Joe Louis Arena, Detroit, Michigan, United States, Hamed defeated WBC featherweight champion Cesar Soto of Mexico over 12 rounds, adding the WBC title to his collection and unified the WBC & WBO titles. Hamed soon chose to relinquish his WBC title due to his commitment to being WBO champion.

Had Vazquez not been stripped by the WBA of his belt (the WBA did not want their featherweight title unified with the WBO), Hamed would have had the distinction of winning all four world titles in a division, something only Riddick Bowe had achieved by that point, at heavyweight.

Hamed vs. Bungu

In March 2000 at Olympia, Kensington, London, Hamed knocked out former undefeated long-reigning IBF super bantamweight title holder, Vuyani Bungu of South Africa. The fight was ended with a single straight left hand, in one of Hamed's most impressive performances and biggest victories.

Hamed vs. Sanchez

Hamed fought in August 2000 against Augie Sanchez at Foxwoods Resort, Mashantucket, Connecticut, United States. Sanchez is known for being the last American to defeat Floyd Mayweather as an amateur boxer.

Hamed successfully retained his WBO title for the fifteenth and final time against Sanchez via a devastating fourth-round knockout. Hamed broke his hand badly in the bout, and following surgery he spent half a year out of the gym, gaining 35 pounds in weight. Rather than face the unknown EBU Champion & WBO mandatory challenger István Kovács, Hamed relinquished his WBO title to pave the way for a Superfight with Marco Antonio Barrera.

Hamed vs. Barrera

Eight weeks prior to the fight, which took place at the MGM Grand Garden Arena in Las Vegas on 7 April 2001, Marco Antonio Barrera prepared to fight. Barrera had moved up a weight division. At the end of training camp he was in the best shape of his life. According to Sky Sports, Barrera had "trained like a monk" in Big Bear, California, while Hamed trained in Bing Crosby's old house. Emanuel Steward had arrived to oversee the last two weeks of Hamed's training, including sparring, and was worried immediately. He had seen Barrera look razor sharp only a few months before in a stoppage win in Las Vegas, and watched Hamed not take his sparring with young Mexicans seriously. The fight was also for the International Boxing Organization World featherweight title.

Barrera handed Naseem Hamed his first and only loss for the lineal featherweight championship by a twelve-round decision. Before the fight, Hamed was a 3 to 1 betting favourite in Las Vegas. Hamed could not hit Barrera with his trademark lefts as Barrera circled to his left and worked both head and body. Barrera was not a fan of Hamed's antics and responded to Hamed's punches during clinches. On one occasion early in the fight, Hamed grabbed Barrera and they both fell to the ground where Barrera threw a right jab, leading to a warning from referee Joe Cortez. In the 12th and final round Barrera trapped Hamed in a full-nelson and forced his head into the turnbuckle, resulting in a point deducted by referee Joe Cortez. Ultimately, Barrera threw more, harder punches and more impressive combinations than Hamed throughout the course of the fight. Barrera was awarded the victory via a unanimous decision, with the scorecards reading 115–112, 115–112, 116–111 and won the lineal and IBO featherweight titles. The fight drew 310,000 pay-per-view buys on HBO. It was the highest-grossing featherweight bout ever in the United States.

Final fight vs. Calvo

On 18 May 2002 at London Arena, Docklands, London, Hamed returned to the ring for what turned out to be his final boxing match, against the European champion Manuel Calvo (33 wins, 4 losses, 1 draw) for the IBO World featherweight title. Hamed was booed by the 10,000 fans as he won unconvincingly on points after 12 rounds looking sluggish and uninterested. The judges scored the fight 120-110 and 119-109 (twice). In a post-fight interview with Ian Darke, Hamed assured a quick return to the ring, which ultimately never happened. Hamed was just 28 years old when he stopped fighting. For years, Hamed did not confirm whether he had retired or not; there were talks of several fights in the UK and in the US, including Hamed's brother and manager, Riath, speaking to HBO about a potential fight with Michael Brodie.

In an interview for BBC Radio Sportsweek, Hamed said that his retirement was largely due to chronic problems with his hands, including multiple fractures as well as surgery.

Personal life
Hamed is a Muslim, and frequently recited the Takbir out loud before his fights. Sean Ingle writes, “he was a proud Muslim who appealed to large chunks of working-class Britain. His last fight was watched by 11 million people on ITV.”

In 1998, he married his girlfriend Eleasha Elphinstone, in Sheffield.

By 1997, Hamed had an annual income of $14million (£) from fight purses and endorsements, ranking at number-22 on Forbes list of the world's highest-paid athletes for 1997. By March 1999, his net worth was an estimated £38million. By January 2001, Hamed had reportedly amassed a fortune of £50million ($). He earned over $million from fight purses, including $8.5million from his fight against Barrera. Hamed was the second richest British boxer, after heavyweight champion Lennox Lewis in 2003.

Driving offences
On 31 March 2006 Hamed pleaded guilty at Sheffield Crown Court of dangerous driving in relation to a collision at Ringinglow Road in Sheffield on 2 May 2005, in which his McLaren-Mercedes SLR crossed a solid white line overtaking a Ford Mondeo and crashed head on into a Volkswagen Golf before hitting the Mondeo. The Golf driver, Anthony Burgin, had fractures to "every major bone" and bruising to the brain; after multiple hospitalisations he was deemed unable ever to work again. Burgin's wife was also injured; Hamed was unhurt. On 12 May 2006 Hamed was sentenced to 15 months' imprisonment and 4 years' disqualification from driving, after the court heard he had been trying to impress his passenger, businessman Asif Ayub. The judge expressed astonishment that the Driver and Vehicle Licensing Agency had refused "apparently on human rights grounds" to disclose Hamed's four previous speeding offences, including a one-year ban for driving a Porsche at 110 mph on the M1 in Derbyshire.

Hamed left prison on 4 September 2006 after serving 16 weeks, and was placed under Home Detention Curfew for the remainder of his sentence, monitored by an electronic tag. After a recommendation from the Honours Forfeiture Committee, he was stripped of his MBE on 12 December 2006. At a jury trial in March 2008, Anthony Burgin was cleared of dangerous driving  in relation to an incident on 19 April 2007 involving Hamed's wife Eleasha.

Legacy

Hamed's boxing career was seen by many experts in the sport as one of massive potential. Frank Warren, the boxing promoter, once said of Hamed: "I think at one stage he was the most exciting fighter that I'd ever been involved with. At one stage, in the early part of his career, he could have gone on to become one of the great fighters. But that disappeared when he didn't fight as regularly as he should have done, when he was cutting corners on his training. It just didn't work out for him from that point on."

Moreover, commentators have pointed out that Hamed's ability should have propelled him to achievements that would have given him legendary status, but that his noted dislike of the long hard training camps and long periods away from his family hindered this.

As popular lower weight fighters like Oscar De La Hoya and Kostya Tszyu moved into the mid-weight classes and the Mexican champion Julio César Chávez declined, Hamed and Arturo Gatti filled the void. Hamed's boxing antics made him the new poster-boy for lighter-weight boxers and his charisma attracted a large number of fans. In 2002 the UK public voted Hamed's victory over Kevin Kelley on the list of the 100 Greatest Sporting Moments.

British boxing pundit Steve Bunce stated on 15 March 2008 edition of BBC panel show Fighting Talk that Hamed was the greatest British boxer of all time. World Boxing, a sister publication of The Ring magazine, ranked Hamed the 11th greatest British boxer of all-time, while Gareth A. Davies, boxing correspondent of The Telegraph ranked him 10th. The Ring also ranked Hamed the 46th greatest puncher of all-time.

Hamed was part of the 2015 class for the International Boxing Hall of Fame. In 2016, ESPN ranked Hamed at number 22 on its list of the top 25 pound-for-pound fighters of the last 25 years.

Cultural impact

Hamed is considered one of the most successful and influential British fighters. UK sports commentator Steve Bunce called him the "most influential fighter of my 35 years in the British boxing business". According to boxing trainer Emanuel Steward, Hamed "opened the door" for British fighters as well as for boxers from lower weight divisions to earn significant prize money; his earnings were unprecedented for a featherweight. According to his boxing trainer nephew SugarHill Steward, Hamed's "flair and skill and confidence" inspired "a generation" and "gave fighters over here a massive opportunity, the confidence to crack the American market." HBO executive Lou DiBella compared his impact to that of Muhammad Ali, arguing that Hamed "changed boxing" and "redefined the fighter as a showman and an entertainer".

He was a source of inspiration for a number of world champions in boxing and MMA, including Tyson Fury, Conor McGregor, Israel Adesanya, Floyd Mayweather, Amir Khan, Ricky Burns, and David Haye. He also inspired a number of boxing trainers who have gone on to train world champions, including SugarHill Steward.

Hamed was referenced by hip-hop artist Nas in the song "You Won't See Me Tonight", with the lyrics "I can't forget how I met you, you thought I was a boxer/ Prince Naseem, but I'm a mobster, Nas from Queens". Hamed himself recorded a song with hip hop group Kaliphz called "Walk Like a Champion", which reached number 23 in the UK Singles Chart in 1996.

Hamed had a licensed sports fighting game, Prince Naseem Boxing, published by Codemasters for the PlayStation console in 2000. A portable version of the game was also released for the Game Boy Color, developed by Virtucraft, which later in 2002 developed a Mike Tyson based follow-up, Mike Tyson Boxing, for the Game Boy Advance.

Hamed also inspired a character called Prince Naseem in Squaresoft's fighting game Ehrgeiz, released in 1998. While called "Prince Naseem" in the original Japanese version, the character's name was changed to "Prince Doza" in the Western versions.

In the Japanese manga series Hajime no Ippo, the fictional American boxing champion Bryan Hawk is based on Naseem Hamed.

In the Japanese manga series Batuque, the fictional character Shyun Amamiya is a fan of Naseem Hamed and takes inspiration from his fighting style. 

In the Tamil movie Sarpatta Parambarai (2021), the boxing style of fictional character Dancing Rose, played by Shabeer Kallarakkal, is based on Naseem Hamed.

Professional boxing record

Television viewership

Pay-per-view bouts
Naseem Hamed held the pay-per-view record in the United Kingdom up until he was surpassed by Lennox Lewis vs. Mike Tyson in 2002.

See also
List of world featherweight boxing champions
List of WBC world champions
List of IBF world champions
List of WBO world champions
List of IBO world champions
List of European Boxing Union bantamweight champions

Notes

References

External links

Naseem Hamed profile at BBC

1974 births
Living people
English male boxers
Southpaw boxers
World Boxing Council champions
International Boxing Federation champions
World Boxing Organization champions
World featherweight boxing champions
Sportspeople from Sheffield
English Muslims
English people of Yemeni descent
People stripped of a British Commonwealth honour
International Boxing Organization champions
Bantamweight boxers
Super-bantamweight boxers
European Boxing Union champions
International Boxing Hall of Fame inductees